The 2016 Houston Texans season was the franchise's 15th season in the National Football League and the third under head coach Bill O'Brien. The Texans' attempt to make history as the first team to play the Super Bowl on their home field, NRG Stadium, was thwarted in the second round of the 2016-17 NFL playoffs by the eventual Super Bowl champion New England Patriots.

The Texans finished 9–7 for the third season in a row and clinched the AFC South for the second season in a row, winning their fourth overall division title; the Texans finished tied with the Tennessee Titans, but won the tiebreaker based on record against division opponents. The 2016 season marked the first time in franchise history that the Texans swept the Indianapolis Colts. This marks the second time in team history that the Texans made the playoffs in back to back years, and the first since 2011–12. This was also the first time in their franchise history where their defense ranked number one in the league, despite losing their injured star defensive end J. J. Watt for most of the season, only allowing 20.5 points per game and only 301.3 yards per game.

The Texans defeated the Oakland Raiders 27–14 in the Wild Card round and advanced to the Divisional Round for the first time since the 2012 season, but they lost to the New England Patriots 34–16.

Draft

Notes
 The Texans traded their sixth-round selection and wide receiver Keshawn Martin to the New England Patriots in exchange for the Patriots' fifth-round selection.
 The Texans made multiple trades within the seventh round:
 Acquiring an additional seventh-round selection in a trade that sent quarterback Case Keenum to the St. Louis Rams (now Los Angeles Rams);
 Trading a seventh-round selection to the Denver Broncos in exchange for offensive tackle Chris Clark;
 Trading a seventh-round selection to the New England Patriots in exchange for quarterback Ryan Mallett.
 Exact numbers of the selections from rounds 4–7 were determined when compensatory selections were awarded on March 11.

Staff

Final roster

Schedule

Preseason

Regular season

Note: Intra-division opponents are in bold text.

Postseason

Game summaries

Regular season

Week 1: vs. Chicago Bears

Brock Osweiler started his first regular season game for the Texans at home against the Chicago Bears. Houston received the ball first and made it all the way to the Chicago 34 before an Osweiler pass was intercepted by Tracy Porter. The Bears capitalized on the turnover with a 1-yard run from Jeremy Langford. In the 2nd quarter, Jay Cutler fumbled the ball on 4th and 1 at the Houston 31. Cutler recovered the fumble but the drive was turned over on downs. Houston scored on the following drive with a 28-yard field goal from Nick Novak. Following a slow offensive start in the first half, Houston trailed Chicago 10–14 at halftime. Momentum shifted in the 2nd half in favor of the Texans, outscoring the Bears 13–0. With the win, Houston improved to 4–0 all time against Chicago.

Week 2: vs. Kansas City Chiefs

The Texans stayed at home for week 2 where they hosted the Kansas City Chiefs, going 0–2 against the Chiefs the previous season, including a 30–0 shutout loss in the Wild Card round. Houston's defense managed Kansas City's offense, holding the Chiefs to only 4 Cairo Santos field goals. The only touchdown of the game came on a 27-yard pass from Brock Osweiler to DeAndre Hopkins in the 1st quarter.

Week 3: at New England Patriots

The Houston Texans fell to the New England Patriots 27–0, dropping to 2–1 for the season. Problems started early for the Texans as Charles James fumbled a kick return that was recovered by Duron Harmon at the Houston 22. The fumble lead to a Jacoby Brissett 27-yard run to extended New England's lead to 10–0 following Stephen Gostkowski's kick late in the first quarter. On the Texans' next possession, a Brock Osweiler pass was intercepted by Jamie Collins. The Patriots gained the ball to start the second half and settled for a 25-yard Gostkowski field goal. On the ensuing kickoff, Tyler Ervin fumbled the ball with Jordan Richards recovering it. Like before, the fumble resulted in a New England touchdown with a 1-yard LeGarrette Blount run. The loss was Houston's first shutout loss since December 7, 2003, where the Texans fell to the Jacksonville Jaguars also by a score of 27–0. It was also head coach Bill O'Brien's first return to New England in 5 years, where he served as an offensive assistant in their undefeated regular season of 2007, as wide receivers coach in 2008, quarterbacks coach from 2009–10, and as offensive coordinator in 2011. O'Brien was also part of two AFC-winning Patriots teams in 2007 and 2011, losing the Super Bowl to the Eli Manning-led New York Giants on both occasions.

Days after the game, defensive end J. J. Watt underwent back surgery to repair a herniated disk. Watt missed the remainder of the 2016 season due to the surgery. Former Texan Antonio Smith was signed to the team to replace Watt for the season.

Week 4: vs. Tennessee Titans

Will Fuller's 67-yard punt return TD late in the third quarter helped the Texans defeat the Titans 27-20. With the victory, the Texans improved to 3-1. Houston also defeated Tennessee for the fifth straight time. The victory is the Texans' 100th overall win in franchise history.

Week 5: at Minnesota Vikings

With the loss, the Texans fell to 3-2 and have yet to defeat the Vikings in franchise history.

Week 6: vs. Indianapolis Colts

The Texans hosted their divisional rivals, the Colts, in a prime time match up. Houston's offense got off to a slow start during the first half with the crowd booing quarterback Brock Osweiler numerous times. While the offense was struggling, Houston's defense kept them in the game to only trail 3–13 at halftime. The Texans' offense scored their first touchdown of the game midway through the third quarter with a 1-yard run from Lamar Miller. Miller's rushing touchdown was his first of the season and Houston's first rushing touchdown of the season. After Miller's touchdown run, Nick Novak missed the extra point, going wide right, to trail 9–13. The Texans' offense faltered again while the Colts started to pull away in the fourth quarter to lead 23–9 with 7:04 left in regulation. Down by 14, the Texans refused to give up and started a comeback against the Colts. Houston tied the game with 0:47 left in regulation on a 26-yard touchdown pass from Osweiler to tight end C. J. Fiedorowicz. With Novak making the extra point, the game was tied at 23–23. Indianapolis tried to win the game in regulation, but were forced to punt with 0:23 left in the game. Houston took the knee to close out the fourth.

The Colts received the ball to begin overtime, but failed to make it out of their own territory. On 3rd and 3 Andrew Luck was sacked by Benardrick McKinney for a 9-yard loss and Indianapolis was forced to punt the ball away. Houston made it into field goal territory after Osweiler found Jaelen Strong for a 36-yard pass at the Indianapolis 12-yard line. On the next play, Osweiler intentionally ran for a 3-yard loss to help set up a Novak field goal. After Osweiler's set up, Novak made the 33-yard field goal to win the game for the Texans, 26–23.

With the win, Houston went to 4–2 on the season, 4–0 at home, and extended their win streak over Indianapolis to a franchise best 2 games.

Week 7: at Denver Broncos

In a MNF matchup, Brock Osweiler returned to Denver for the first time after leaving the Broncos in the offseason. But his success last week wasn't enough this week as the Broncos held the Texans to three field goals for the win. With the loss, the Texans fell to 4–3.

Week 8: vs. Detroit Lions

The Texans rebounded from their dismal Monday Night performance and never trailed in their first matchup against the Detroit Lions since Houston's Thanksgiving 2012 win in OT. With the win, the Texans entered the Week 9 bye at 5-3.

Week 10: at Jacksonville Jaguars

The Texans got their first road win of the season and their first winning streak since Weeks 1–2, improving to 6–3.

Week 11: at Oakland Raiders
NFL International Series

Following their first road win of the season the previous week, the Texans traveled to Mexico City to face the Oakland Raiders in what would be a controversial game. Houston received the opening kickoff and Brock Osweiler found DeAndre Hopkins for a 60-yard touchdown pass and run, but Hopkins was ruled out of bounds after gaining 24 yards. The instant replay showed that Hopkins stayed in bounds, but the play could not be challenged due to an NFL rule that says a play where a player is ruled out of bounds cannot be challenged. After the officiating error, the Texans' opening drive ended in a 32-yard field goal from Nick Novak. In the 4th quarter, with the game tied 20–20, the Texans made it to the Raiders' 16-yard line. On 3rd and 2, Lamar Miller ran the ball and appeared to have gained the 1st down, but was ruled just short. On 4th and inches, Houston decided to go for it and handed the ball off to Akeem Hunt. Hunt also appeared to have gained the 1st down, but was ruled short. The play was challenged, but the call was upheld. The spot of the ball on both plays was heavily criticized as both Miller and Hunt appeared to have gained enough yards for a 1st down. On the ensuing drive, Oakland would score the game-winning touchdown with a 35-yard pass from Derek Carr to Amari Cooper.

Along the controversial officiating, a fan in the stands shined a laser pointer in the eyes of Osweiler and Miller throughout the game.

Week 12: vs. San Diego Chargers

The Texans fell to the Chargers 21–13, losing their first and only home game of the season and dropping to 6–5.

Week 13: at Green Bay Packers

Houston lost for the first time in Green Bay, falling to .500 and 6-6.

Week 14: at Indianapolis Colts

With the win, the Texans moved up to 7–6 and swept the Colts for the first time in franchise history. They also snapped their three-game losing streak.

Week 15: vs. Jacksonville Jaguars

The Texans were down 13-5 at halftime and had a deficit as large as 20-8, but ultimately rallied to win 21-20. With the comeback win, the Texans improved to 8-6 and extended their divisional winning streak to 10 games, and six straight against Jacksonville.

Notes
Quarterback Brock Osweiler was pulled from the game and benched in favor of Tom Savage during the second quarter. Osweiler went 6/11 for 48 yards and threw two back-to-back interceptions before being pulled from the game in the middle of the second quarter.

Week 16: vs. Cincinnati Bengals

Quarterback Tom Savage got his first career NFL start against the Cincinnati Bengals. Savage struggled in the first half against the Bengals' stout defense, being sacked on two back-to-back plays in the first quarter for a huge loss. The first score of the game came on a last second 43–yard field goal from Randy Bullock to put Cincinnati up 3–0 going into halftime. The Texans responded on their first possession in the second half with a 25–yard field goal from Nick Novak to tie the game at 3–3. The Bengals punted the ball on their next possession. Receiving the ball back, another drive stalled for the Texans as they had to settle for a 22–yard field goal from Novak to take a 6–3 lead. Cincinnati tried to respond to the Houston field goal, but a tipped pass from Andy Dalton was intercepted by Quentin Demps. The Texans came up short on the interception and were forced to punt the ball back. After receiving the kick, the Bengals quickly struck with Dalton finding Brandon LaFell for an 86–yard touchdown pass. With Bullock making the extra point the Bengals took a 10–6 lead with 10:45 left to play. Houston responded on their next drive with a 24–yard touchdown run from Alfred Blue, but Novak's extra point was blocked. After both teams traded punts, the Bengals marched down to the Houston 25–yard line to try the game-winning field goal. Cincinnati kicker Randy Bullock, who had been released by the Texans the previous season, tried for the game-winning field goal, but it went wide right.

With the win and the Tennessee Titans losing earlier in the day, the Texans won their second straight AFC South title.

Week 17: at Tennessee Titans

Tom Savage started at quarterback for the Texans, but was pulled from the game in the 1st quarter due to a possible concussion. After Savage was pulled, Brock Osweiler, who had been benched 2 weeks prior, came in as quarterback.

With the loss, the Texans finished the regular season at 9-7 for the third straight year. Their ten-game winning streak against divisional opponents was snapped, as well as their five-game winning streak against the Titans.

Postseason

AFC Wild Card Playoffs: vs. (5) Oakland Raiders

In a rematch of a controversial game from week 11, the Houston Texans hosted the Oakland Raiders for the first playoff game of the 2016 season.

Brock Osweiler started as the Texans' quarterback with Tom Savage still out due to concussion protocol. On the other side of the field, Oakland Raiders quarterback Connor Cook started his first-ever NFL game, which also happened to be in the postseason, becoming the first rookie in NFL history since the inception of the Super Bowl to do so. With eight minutes remaining in the first quarter, the Texans drew first blood with a 50-yard Nick Novak field goal, and a handoff from Texans QB Brock Osweiler to Lamar Miller touchdown and Novak PAT soon made the game 10–0. A 37-yard punt return on a 51-yard punt from Shane Lechler by Jalen Richard gave the Raiders good field position for a Latavius Murray rushing touchdown to bring the Raiders back into the game at 10–7 after a Sebastian Janikowski PAT. The Texans and then the Raiders exchanged three-and-outs, setting the scene for a coffin corner punt by Marquette King that pinned the Texans at their own five-yard line. However, the Texans recovered and scored again on a narrowly good Novak 38-yard field goal. A subsequent DeAndre Hopkins touchdown reception further widened their lead to 20–7 at the half. Neither team was able to put anything on the scoreboard in the third quarter. However, with 12:28 left to go in the fourth quarter, Brock Osweiler went untouched for a 1-yard rushing touchdown, making the score 27–7. The Raiders rallied back with an 8-yard touchdown pass from Cook to Andre Holmes, but that would be the last score of the game as Connor Cook's next drive was abruptly halted after a tipped-ball interception by Texans cornerback A. J. Bouye sealed the Raiders' fate. The final score was 27–14 to the Texans.

AFC Divisional Playoffs: at (1) New England Patriots
{{Americanfootballbox
 |titlestyle=;text-align:center;
 |state=autocollapse
 |title=AFC Divisional Playoffs: (4) Houston Texans at (1) New England Patriots – Game summary
 |date=
 |time=8:15 p.m. EST/7:15 p.m. CST
 |road=Texans
 |R1=3|R2=10|R3=0|R4=3
 |home=Patriots
 |H1=14|H2=3|H3=7|H4=10
 |stadium=Gillette Stadium, Foxborough, Massachusetts
 |attendance=66,829
 |weather=, cloudy and cold
 |referee=Pete Morelli
 |TV=CBS
 |TVAnnouncers=Jim Nantz, Phil Simms and Tracy Wolfson
 |reference=Recap, Gamebook
 |scoring=
First quarter
NE – Dion Lewis 13-yard pass from Tom Brady (Stephen Gostkowski kick), 9:27. Patriots 7–0. Drive: 2 plays, 65 yards, 0:43.
HOU – Nick Novak 33-yard field goal, 1:15. Patriots 7–3. Drive: 14 plays, 62 yards, 8:12.
NE – Dion Lewis 98-yard kick return (Stephen Gostkowski kick), 1:00. Patriots 14–3.Second quarterHOU – Nick Novak 27-yard field goal, 11:39. Patriots 14–6. Drive: 6 plays, 18 yards, 2:45.
HOU – C. J. Fiedorowicz 10-yard pass from Brock Osweiler, 10:49. Patriots 14–13. Drive: 2 plays, 12 yards, 0:40.
NE – Stephen Gostkowski 19-yard field goal, 0:07. Patriots 17–13. Drive: 10 plays, 66 yards, 3:47.Third quarterNE – James White 19-yard pass from Tom Brady (Stephen Gostkowski kick), 9:09. Patriots 24–13. Drive: 9 plays, 90 yards, 3:21.Fourth quarterHOU – Nick Novak 44-yard field goal, 14:51. Patriots 24–16. Drive: 4 plays, 6 yards, 0:50.
NE – Dion Lewis 1-yard run (Stephen Gostkowski kick), 12:16. Patriots 31–16. Drive: 1 play, 5 yards, 0:28.
NE – Stephen Gostkowski 42-yard field goal, 6:37. Patriots 34–16. Drive: 10 plays, 43 yards, 3:45.
 |stats=Top passersHOU – Brock Osweiler – 23/40, 198 yards, TD, 3 INT
NE – Tom Brady – 18/38, 287 yards, 2 TD, 2 INT Top rushersHOU – Lamar Miller – 19 rushes, 73 yards
NE – Dion Lewis – 13 rushes, 41 yards, TDTop receiversHOU – DeAndre Hopkins – 6 receptions, 65 yards
NE – Julian Edelman – 8 receptions, 137 yards
}}

With this loss, the Texans become the latest victim of the Super Bowl home field curse, as no host team had ever played the championship game on its own home field (with the previous week's victory, they had already become only the third Super Bowl host team - and the first other than the Miami Dolphins - to win a playoff game). They finish with an overall record of 10-8.

Standings

Division

Conference

Statistics

Team

IndividualSource''':

References

External links
 

Houston
Houston Texans seasons
Houston Texans
AFC South championship seasons